Christian Brothers High School may refer to schools under the auspices of both the Congregation of Christian Brothers and the De La Salle Brothers, using the name Christian Brothers.

Australia
Christian Brothers School, Balmain, New South Wales
Christian Brothers College, Burwood, New South Wales
Christian Brothers' High School, Lewisham, New South Wales
Christian Brothers College, Rose Bay, New South Wales
Christian Brothers College, Adelaide, South Australia
Christian Brothers' College, Perth, Western Australia
Christian Brothers College, St Kilda, Victoria

United States
Christian Brothers High School (Sacramento, California)
Christian Brothers College High School, St. Louis, Missouri
Christian Brothers Academy (New Jersey), Lincroft
Christian Brothers Academy (Albany, New York)
Christian Brothers Academy (DeWitt, New York)
Christian Brothers High School (Memphis, Tennessee)
Quincy Notre Dame High School, in Quincy, Illinois, a.k.a. Christian Brothers High School

Elsewhere
Christian Brothers College, Cork, Ireland
Christian Brothers' School, Glen Road, Belfast, Northern Ireland
Christian Brothers Grammar School, Omagh, Northern Ireland
Christian Brothers' College, Mount Edmund, Pretoria, South Africa
Christian Brothers College, Bulawayo, Zimbabwe
Christian Brothers High School or Kavanagh College, Dunedin, New Zealand

See also
 List of Christian Brothers schools
Christian Brothers (disambiguation)